The Girl from Rio is a 1927 American silent romance film directed by Tom Terriss and starring Carmel Myers, Walter Pidgeon and Richard Tucker.

Synopsis
An American coffee purchaser arrives in Rio de Janeiro and falls in love with a local café dancer.

Cast
 Carmel Myers as Lola 
 Walter Pidgeon as Paul Sinclair 
 Richard Tucker as Antonio Santos 
 Henry Hebert as Farael Fuentes 
 Mildred Harris as Helen Graham 
 Edward Raquello as Raoul the dancer

References

Bibliography
 Munden, Kenneth White. The American Film Institute Catalog of Motion Pictures Produced in the United States, Part 1. University of California Press, 1997.

External links
 

1927 films
1920s romance films
American silent feature films
American romance films
Films directed by Tom Terriss
American black-and-white films
Films set in Rio de Janeiro (city)
Gotham Pictures films
1920s English-language films
1920s American films